Mathias Erang (1 May 1902 – 20 December 1978) was a Luxembourgian gymnast. He competed at the 1924 Summer Olympics, the 1928 Summer Olympics and the 1936 Summer Olympics.

References

External links
 

1902 births
1978 deaths
Luxembourgian male artistic gymnasts
Olympic gymnasts of Luxembourg
Gymnasts at the 1924 Summer Olympics
Gymnasts at the 1928 Summer Olympics
Gymnasts at the 1936 Summer Olympics
Sportspeople from Saarland
20th-century Luxembourgian people